

Bruno Bieler (18 June 1888 – 22 March 1966) was a general in the Wehrmacht of Nazi Germany who commanded the XLII Corps during World War II. He was a recipient of the Knight's Cross of the Iron Cross.

Awards and decorations
 Iron Cross (1914)  2nd Class (17 September 1914) &  1st Class  (15 December 1914)
 Military Merit Order, 4th class with Swords (Bavaria, 20 April 1918)
 Hanseatic Cross of Hamburg (23 February 1918)
 Merit Cross for War Aid (Prussia, 4 November 1919)
 Silesian Eagle  2nd Class (1 September 1921) & 1st Class (30 September 1921)
 Honour Cross of the World War 1914/1918 (14 January 1935)
 Wehrmacht Long Service Award 1st Class (2 October 1936)
 Commander of the Order of the Sword (Sweden, 22 April 1938)
 Clasp to the Iron Cross (1939) 2nd Class (12 September 1939) & 1st Class (30 September 1939)
 Eastern Front Medal (15 July 1942)
 Crimea Shield (23 August 1942)
 Knight's Cross of the Iron Cross on 26 October 1941 as Generalleutnant and commander of 73. Infanterie Division
 German Cross in Gold on 20 November 1942 as General der Infanterie and commanding general of the VI. Armeekorps

References

Citations

Bibliography

 
 
 

1888 births
1966 deaths
People from Gusev
People from East Prussia
German Army generals of World War II
Generals of Infantry (Wehrmacht)
German Army personnel of World War I
Recipients of the clasp to the Iron Cross, 1st class
Recipients of the Gold German Cross
Recipients of the Knight's Cross of the Iron Cross
Commanders of the Order of the Sword
Reichswehr personnel